Goar was a leader of the Alans in 5th-century Gaul.

Goar may also refer to:

People

Given name
Goar of Aquitaine (c. 585–649), a priest and hermit of the seventh century; patron saint of innkeepers, potters, and vine growers
Goar Hlgatian (born 1975), Armenian chess player
Goar Mestre (1912–1994), Cuban-born Argentine businessman
Goar Vartanian (1926–2019), Armenian spy

Surname
Carol Goar (contemporary), Canadian journalist
Jacques Goar (1601–1653), French Dominican and Hellenist
Jim Goar (born 1975), American poet
Jot Goar (1870–1947), American professional baseball player

Other uses
Sankt Goar, a town in Rhineland-Palatinate, Germany
Sankt Goar line, an isogloss separating dialects in Germany
Sankt Goar-Oberwesel, a former collective municipality in Rhineland-Palatinate, Germany

See also
 Gor (disambiguation)
 Gore (disambiguation)
 Gorr (disambiguation)